Kara Del or Qara Del was a Mongol-led kingdom that existed in Hami in present-day Xinjiang. It was founded by the Yuan prince Gunashiri, a descendant of Chagatai Khan, in the late 14th century (c.1389), and ruled by the Chagatayids thereafter until 1463. From 1380, it began to tribute to Ming dynasty. From 1406, it was governed by Ming under the Kara Del Guard, however sometimes it was still under the influence of the Northern Yuan, and the ruler was called the Obedient King under the Jimi system. It was destroyed as a result of the wars between the Ming dynasty and the Oirats, as well as dynastic succession struggles in 1513. Kara Del means "black chest" in the Mongolian language.

History
In 1389, the Buddhist Chagataid prince Gunashiri broke away from the Northern Yuan dynasty, which had fallen under the reign of Jorightu Khan Yesüder, an Arig-Bokid prince. He established himself in Hami by 1390 and ruled over a Uyghur population. The next year, the Ming dynasty occupied his territory and forced him to submit, although he remained in control of his territory.

In 1404, Gunashiri's successor Engke Temiir accepted the establishment of a Ming guard and became Hami Prefecture. However the Ming did not directly govern Hami or collect taxes. Engke Temiir was granted the title Zhongshunwang (meaning the obedient prince) by the Ming court. During the 1430s, Kara Del submitted to the Oirats. The Uyghurs of Hami came into regular contact with Mongols in southwestern Inner Mongolia. Several Uyghur chiefs became major leaders of the western Mongols, leading to the spread of Uyghurjin as a clan name in the Ordos area.

In 1446, disturbances broke out in Hami. Ming forces under Ren Li occupied the city and deported 1,230 people to the east of Jiayuguan.

In 1463 the khan was overthrown by a pro-Mongol faction and a serious succession crisis ensued. From 1467, the Ming emperors repeatedly reinstalled members of Gunashiri's house but the situation in Hami never stabilized. Hami was conquered by Mansur Khan, the ruler of Moghulistan in 1513. Kara Del officially converted to Islam in 1513.

It was reported that between Khitay and Khotan the Sarigh Uyghur tribes who were "impious" resided, and they were targeted for ghazat (holy war) by Mansur Khan following 1516. After the islamization of Kara Del, Uyghur fell into disuse until the 20th century, except as a local term for Muslim Turks in Hami and Turpan. In 1923, Uyghur was revived again as a general designation for Xinjiang's Tarim Basin oasis dwellers.

Culture
Buddhism survived in Uyghurstan (Turfan and Qocho) during the Ming dynasty.

List of rulers of Kara Del

According to Japanese Wikipedia (:ja:グナシリ):

 Unaširi (兀納失里) (1380–1393)
 Engke Temür (安克帖木兒) (1393–1405) (Vassal of Ming dynasty since June 1404)   
 Toqto (脫脫) (1405–1411) (Vassal of Ming dynasty)
 Manglī Temür (免力帖木兒) (1411–1425) (Vassal of Ming dynasty)
 Budaširi (卜答失里) (1425–1439) (Originally vassal of Ming dynasty, later of Northern Yuan dynasty). He was rivalled firstly Toγon Temür (脫歡帖木兒) (1427–1437) and Toqto Temür (脫脫塔木兒) (1437–1439), the son of rival.
 Khalīl sulṭān (哈力鎖鲁檀) (1439–1457) (Originally vassal of Northern Yuan dynasty till 1455, later of Ming dynasty)
 Bürege (卜列革) (1457–1460)
 Nugandaširi (1460–1467), queen mother

Rivalry between Nugandaširi (努溫答失里) (1460–1472) and Baγ Temür (把塔木兒) (1466–1472)

 Qanšin (罕慎) (1472–1488)
 Engke Bolad (奄克孛剌) (1488–1492) and (1493–1497)
 Šamba (陕巴) (1492–1493) and (1497–1505)
 Beyazıt (拜牙即) (1505–1513)

See also
Kingdom of Qocho
Ming–Turpan conflict
Islamicisation and Turkicisation of Xinjiang

References

Bibliography

Mongol states
History of Xinjiang
Former countries in Chinese history
Khanates